The 1906 Marshall Thundering Herd football team represented Marshall College (now Marshall University) in the 1906 college football season. Marshall posted an undefeated 4–0–1 record, outscoring its opposition 56–5.  Home games were played on a campus field called "Central Field" which is presently Campus Commons.

Schedule

References

Marshall
Marshall Thundering Herd football seasons
College football undefeated seasons
Marshall Thundering Herd football